Ahmad Mazani is an Iranian cleric and reformist politician and a member of the Parliament of Iran representing Tehran, Rey, Shemiranat and Eslamshahr electoral district.

Career 
Mazani was a senior manager in Foundation of Martyrs and Veterans Affairs.

Electoral history

References

Living people
National Trust Party (Iran) politicians
Members of the 10th Islamic Consultative Assembly
Islamic Republican Party politicians
Year of birth missing (living people)